Senator Munoz or Muñoz may refer to:

Antonio Munoz (American politician) (born 1964), Illinois State Senate
George Muñoz (politician) (fl. 2000s–2010s), New Mexico State Senate